Oumar Fall (born 1945) is a Senegalese boxer. He competed in the men's light middleweight event at the 1972 Summer Olympics. At the 1972 Summer Olympics, he lost to Svetomir Belić of Yugoslavia.

References

1945 births
Living people
Senegalese male boxers
Olympic boxers of Senegal
Boxers at the 1972 Summer Olympics
Place of birth missing (living people)
Light-middleweight boxers